Chad has sent athletes to every Summer Olympic Games held between 1964 and 1972 (boycotting 1976 and 1980 editions) and from 1984 to 2020, Chad never won an Olympic medal. No athletes from Chad have competed in any Winter Olympic Games.

The National Olympic Committee for Chad is the Comité Olympique et Sportif Tchadien. It was started in 1963 and recognized in 1964.

Medal tables

Medals by Summer Games

See also
 List of flag bearers for Chad at the Olympics
 :Category:Olympic competitors for Chad

References

External links